Ahmed El Midaoui was President of the Moroccan Court of Audit until his replacement and Minister of the Interior between 10 November 1999 and 7 November 2002, being in the office during the Perejil Island crisis in 2002.

Career 
 He was a financial inspector in 1971, in 1974 he was a state financial controller with several companies and public establishments, then head of the industrial and agro-industrial activities department.
  He became a consultant on public enterprises and public finance to several international organizations. 
 In 1980, he obtained a Doctor of State in Law from the University of Paris.
  Lecturer at the Development Leaders Program at Harvard University in the United States of America (2002)
  On the 16th he became governor of the prefecture of Mohammedia-Zenata.
  On the 20th he became governor of the Tangier.
  In 1993, he became Director General of Moroccan National Security.
  In 1999, he was appointed Minister of the Interior in the Government Abderrahman el-Youssoufi until 2001 when he was appointed adviser to King Mohammed VI.
 In February 2003, he was appointed First President of the Court of Auditors. He is also chairman of the French-speaking group and a speaker at the Symposium organized by the UN and the International Organization of Supreme Audit Institutions (INTOSAI) on the independence of supreme audit institutions.
 Since October 2004, he has been First Vice-President of the 18 th Congress of INTOSAI. 
 Elected by his peers at the international level:
Former President of the Association of Supreme Audit Institutions having in common the use of the French (AISCCUF), and Honorary President of this association. Chairman of the Institutional Capacity Building Committee as part of the implementation of the INTOSAI Strategic Plan 2005-2010

Works 
 In 1981: Public Enterprises in Morocco and their participation in development.

References 

Living people
1948 births
People from Taounate
Government ministers of Morocco
Moroccan civil servants